The Fujiwhara effect, sometimes referred to as the Fujiwara effect, Fujiw(h)ara interaction or binary interaction, is a phenomenon that occurs when two nearby cyclonic vortices move around each other and close the distance between the circulations of their corresponding low-pressure areas. The effect is named after Sakuhei Fujiwhara, the Japanese meteorologist who initially described the effect.  Binary interaction of smaller circulations can cause the development of a larger cyclone, or cause two cyclones to merge into one. Extratropical cyclones typically engage in binary interaction when within  of one another, while tropical cyclones typically interact within  of each other.

Description

When cyclones are in proximity of one another, their centers will circle each other cyclonically (counter-clockwise in the Northern Hemisphere and clockwise in the Southern Hemisphere) about a point between the two systems due to their cyclonic wind circulations. The two vortices will be attracted to each other, and eventually spiral into the center point and merge. It has not been agreed upon whether this is due to the divergent portion of the wind or vorticity advection. When the two vortices are of unequal size, the larger vortex will tend to dominate the interaction, and the smaller vortex will circle around it. The effect is named after Sakuhei Fujiwhara, the Japanese meteorologist who initially described it in a 1921 paper about the motion of vortices in water.

Tropical cyclones

Tropical cyclones can form when smaller circulations within the Intertropical Convergence Zone merge. The effect is often mentioned in relation to the motion of tropical cyclones, although the final merging of the two storms is uncommon. The effect becomes noticeable when they approach within  of each other. Rotation rates within binary pairs accelerate when tropical cyclones close within  of each other. Merger of the two systems (or shearing out of one of the pair) becomes realized when they are within  of one another.

Extratropical cyclones

Binary interaction is seen between nearby extratropical cyclones when within  of each other, with significant acceleration occurring when the low-pressure areas are within  of one another.  Interactions between their circulations at the 500 hPa level (18,000 feet above sea level) behave more predictably than their surface circulations. This most often results in a merging of the two low-pressure systems into a single extratropical cyclone, or can less commonly result in a change of direction of one or both of the cyclones. The precise results of such interactions depend on factors such as the size of the two cyclones, their distance from each other, and the prevailing atmospheric conditions around them.

See also

 Satellite tornado

References

External links
 Edward N. Rappaport, NOAA Hurricane Research Division – "Hurricane Iris Preliminary Report"

Vortices
Tropical cyclone meteorology
Articles containing video clips